Emerio Fainuulua (born ) is a male boxer from Samoa. He competed at the 1990 Commonwealth Games, where he won a bronze medal for boxing in the Men's Heavyweight class.

Fainuulua is a cousin of Samoan boxer Sililo Figota.

References

Heavyweight boxers
Boxers at the 1990 Commonwealth Games
Commonwealth Games bronze medallists for Samoa
Living people
Samoan male boxers
Commonwealth Games medallists in boxing
Year of birth missing (living people)
Medallists at the 1990 Commonwealth Games